Shizuoka 1st district (Japanese: 静岡県第1区) is a single-member electoral district for the House of Representatives, the lower house of the National Diet of Japan. It is represented by Minister of Justice Yōko Kamikawa.

References

See also 

 List of districts of the House of Representatives of Japan

Districts of the House of Representatives (Japan)